Camera Shy is an American indie pop band from Oakland, California. The duo consists of instrumentalist Nick Bassett (also of Whirr and formerly of Nothing) and vocalist Alexandra Morte (also of Night School and formerly of Whirr). They have released two EPs and one full-length album.

History
Camera Shy was formed in 2014. After signing with Run for Cover Records, the band released their debut EP, Jack-o-Lantern, on June 9, 2014. It was followed by the "Crystal Clear" single on April 18, 2015, which included a cover of the Misfits' "She" as one of the two B-sides.

Camera Shy released their eponymous debut studio album on July 14, 2015.

Discography

Studio albums
Camera Shy (2015, Run for Cover)

Singles and EPs
Jack-o-Lantern (2014, Run for Cover)
"Crystal Clear" (2015, Run for Cover)

References

Indie pop groups from California
Musical groups established in 2014
2014 establishments in California
Run for Cover Records artists